The 4th millennium BC spanned the years 4000 BC to 3001 BC. Some of the major changes in human culture during this time included the beginning of the Bronze Age and the invention of writing, which played a major role in starting recorded history.

The city states of Sumer and the kingdom of Egypt were established and grew to prominence. Agriculture spread widely across Eurasia.

World population growth relaxed after the burst that came about from the Neolithic Revolution. World population was largely stable in this time at roughly 50 million with a slow overall growth rate at roughly 0.03% p.a.

Culture

Near East

Mesopotamia
4100–3100 BC – the Uruk period, with emerging Sumerian hegemony and development of "proto-cuneiform" writing; base-60 mathematics, astronomy and astrology, civil law, complex hydrology, the sailboat, potter's wheel and wheel; the Chalcolithic proceeds into the Early Bronze Age.
3500–2340 BC – Sumer: wheeled carts, potter's wheel, White Temple ziggurat, bronze tools and weapons.
First to Fourth dynasty of Kish in Mesopotamia.
Sumerian temple of Janna at Eridu erected.
Temple at Al-Ubaid and tomb of Mes-Kalam-Dug built near Ur, Chaldea.
3000 BC – Tin is in use in Mesopotamia soon after this time.
3500–2340 BC – First cities developed in Southern Mesopotamia. Inhabitants migrated from north.
The cuneiform script proper emerges from pictographic proto-writing in the later 4th millennium. Mesopotamia's "proto-literate" period spans the 35th to 32nd centuries BC. The first documents unequivocally written in the Sumerian language date to the 31st century BC, found at Jemdet Nasr.
Dams, canals, stone sculptures using inclined plane and lever in Sumer.
Urkesh (northern Syria) founded during the fourth millennium BC possibly by the Hurrians.
The Courtyard is introduced to Mesopotamia.
Persian plateau
4000 BC – Susa is a center of pottery production.
c. 4000 BC – Beaker from Susa (modern Shush, Iran) is made. It is now at Musée du Louvre, Paris.
Proto-Elamite from 3200 BC.
Anatolia and Caucasus
c. 3700 BC to 3000 BC – The Maykop culture of the Caucasus, contemporary to the Kurgan culture, is a candidate for the origin of Bronze production and thus the Bronze Age.
3400–2000 BC – Kura-Araxes: earliest evidence found on the Ararat plain.

Egypt
 4000–3000 BC – Naqada culture on the Nile. First hieroglyphs appear thus far around 3500 BC as found on labels in a ruler's tomb at Abydos.
 Predynastic pharaohs Tiu, Thesh, Hsekiu, Wazner, Ro, Serket, Narmer.
3500–3400 BC – Jar with boat designs, from Hierakonpolis (today in the Brooklyn Museum) is created. Predynastic Egypt.
c. 3150 BC – Predynastic period ended in Ancient Egypt. Early Dynastic (Archaic) period started (according to French Egyptologist Nicolas Grimal). The period includes 1st and 2nd Dynasties.
c. 3100 BC – Narmer Palette.
Sails used in the Nile.
Mastabas, the predecessors of the Egyptian pyramids.
Harps and flutes played in Egypt.
Lyres and double clarinets (arghul, mijwiz) played in Egypt.
Earliest known numerals in Egypt.

Europe

 Crete: Rise of Minoan civilization.
c. 4000 BC – First neolithic settlers in the island of Thera (Santorini), Greece, migrating probably from Minoan Crete.
Pontic–Caspian steppe
 3500–2300 BC – The Yamna culture ("Kurgan culture"), succeeding the Sredny Stog culture on the Pontic–Caspian steppe in the Caucasus and Central Asia. This culture is believed to have been the locus of the Proto-Indo-Europeans, and thus the Urheimat, or point of origin, of the Proto Indo-European language, according to the Kurgan hypothesis.
 5500–2750 BC – The Trypillian culture has cities with 15,000 citizens, eastern Europe.
Kurgan culture of what is now Southern Russia and Ukraine; possibly the first domestication of the horse.
Balkans
c. 3500 BC – Figures of a man and a woman, from Cernavodă, Romania, are made. They are now at National Historical Museum, Bucharest.
c. 3138 BC Ljubljana Marshes Wheel is a wooden wheel that was found in the Ljubljana Marsh in Slovenia. Radiocarbon dating showed that it is approximately 5,150 years old, which makes it the oldest wooden wheel yet discovered.
c. 4000–2000 BC – People and animals, a detail of rock-shelter painting in Cogul (Roca dels Moros), Lleida, Spain, are painted. It is now at Archaeology Museum of Catalonia, Barcelona.
Arzachena & Ozieri cultures.
Malta
3600 BC – Construction of the Ġgantija megalithic temple complex on the Island of Gozo: the world's oldest extant unburied free-standing structures, and the world's oldest religious structures. (See Göbekli Tepe for older, buried religious structures.)
3600–3200 BC – Construction of the first temple within the Mnajdra solar temple complex, containing "furniture" such as stone benches and tables, that set it apart from other European megalith constructions.
3600–3000 BC – Construction of the Ta' Ħaġrat and Kordin III temples.
3250–3000 BC – Construction of three megalithic temples at Tarxien.
3200–2500 BC – Construction of the Ħaġar Qim megalithic temple complex, featuring both solar and lunar alignments.
Northern Europe
 4000–2700 BC – The Funnelbeaker culture, Scandinavia, originated in southern parts of Europe and slowly advanced up through today's Uppland.
3300–2900 BC – Construction of the Newgrange solar observatory/passage tomb in Ireland.
c. 3100–2600 BC – Neolithic settlement at Skara Brae in the Orkney Islands, Scotland, is inhabited.
Construction in England of the Sweet Track, the world's first known engineered roadway.
Garth tsunami in the Northern Isles.
 c. 3100 BC – The earliest phase of the Stonehenge monument (a circular earth bank and ditch).
The Céide Fields are developed, the first signs of the eventual complete deforestation of Ireland.
c. 3300 BC – Ötzi the Iceman dies near the present-day border between Austria and Italy, only to be discovered in 1991 buried in a glacier of the Ötztal Alps. His cause of death is believed to be homicide.

Central Asia
 3500–2500 BC – Afanasevo: Siberia, Mongolia, Xinjiang, Kazakhstan—late copper and early Bronze Age.
c. 4000 BC – Horses are domesticated in the western Eurasian Steppes in what is now northern Kazakhstan (see the Botai culture).

East Asia
 Neolithic Chinese settlements. They produced silk and pottery (chiefly the Yangshao and the Longshan cultures), wore hemp clothing, and domesticated pigs and dogs.
 4000–2500 BC – Vietnamese Bronze Age culture. The Đồng Đậu Culture, produced many wealthy bronze objects.

South Asia
Mehrgarh III–VI
3500 BC Metalcasting began in the Mohenjodaro area.
3300 BC – Bronze Age starts in Indus Valley (Harappa).
Drainage and Sewage collection and disposal
Ochre Coloured Pottery culture

Americas
c. 3600 BC – In Colombia, first rupestrian art Chiribiquete (Caquetá).
c. 3000 BC – First pottery in Colombia at Puerto Hormiga (Magdalena), considered one of the first attempts of pottery of the New World. First settlement at Puerto Badel (Bolívar).
c. 3600 BC – Evidence of maize domestication appear in the Valley of Tehuacán.
Norte Chico civilization in Northern Peru starts.

Australia
 c. 3000 BC – The Sydney rock engravings in present-day (Sydney, Australia).

Sub-Saharan Africa
Sub-Saharan Africa remains in the Paleolithic period, except for the earliest neolithization of the Sahel following the desiccation of the Sahara in c. 3500 BC. As the grasslands of the Sahara began drying after 3900 BC, herders spread into the Nile Valley and into eastern Africa (Eburan 5, Elmenteitan). The desiccation of the Sahara and the associated neolithisation of West Africa is also cited as a possible cause for the dispersal of the Niger-Congo linguistic phylum.

Environment

Based on studies by glaciologist Lonnie Thompson, professor at Ohio State University and researcher with the Byrd Polar Research Center, a number of indicators shows there was a global change in climate 5,200 years ago, probably due to a drop in solar energy output.
 The Older Peron transgression was a period identified in 1961 happening between 6,000 and 4,600 years BP when sea levels were 3 to 5 metres higher than today.
Plants buried in the Quelccaya Ice Cap in the Peruvian Andes demonstrate the climate had shifted suddenly and severely to capture the plants and preserve them until now.
c. 3750 BC – The last North American mammoths, on Saint Paul Island, Alaska, go extinct.
Tree rings from Ireland and England show this was their driest period.
Ice core records showing the ratio of two oxygen isotopes retrieved from the ice fields atop Africa's Mount Kilimanjaro, a proxy for atmospheric temperature at the time snow fell.
Major changes in plant pollen uncovered from lakebed cores in South America.
Record lowest levels of methane retrieved from ice cores from Greenland and Antarctica.
End of the Neolithic Subpluvial, start of desertification of Sahara (35th century BC). North Africa shifts from a habitable region to a barren desert.
c. 3150 BC – a lesser Tollmann's hypothetical bolide event may have occurred.
3051 BC – The oldest currently (2013) living non-clonal organism germinated in the present-day Grove of the Ancients, Inyo County, California.

Calendars and chronology
4000 BC – Epoch of the Masonic calendar's Anno Lucis era.
3929 BC – Creation according to John Lightfoot based on the Old Testament of the Bible, and often associated with the Ussher chronology.
3761 BC – Since the Middle Ages (12th century), the Hebrew calendar has been based on rabbinic calculations of the year of creation from the Hebrew Masoretic text of the bible. This calendar is used within Jewish communities for religious and other purposes. The calendar's epoch, corresponding to the calculated date of the world's creation, is equivalent to sunset on the Julian proleptic calendar date 6 October 3761 BC.
3114 BC – One version of the Mayan calendar, known as the Mesoamerican Long Count, uses the epoch of 11 or 13 August 3114 BC. The Maya Long Count calendar was first used approximately 236 BC (see Mesoamerican Long Count calendar#Earliest Long Counts.
3102 BC – According to calculations of Aryabhata (6th century), the Hindu Kali Yuga began at midnight on 18 February 3102 BC.
3102 BC – Aryabhata dates the events of the Mahabharata to around 3102 BC. Other estimates range from the late 4th to the mid-2nd millennium BC.

Centuries

 40th century BC
 39th century BC
 38th century BC
 37th century BC
 36th century BC
 35th century BC
 34th century BC
 33rd century BC
 32nd century BC
 31st century BC

References

 
-96